Gridin is a Russian masculine surname, its feminine counterpart is Gridina. It may refer to

Andrey Gridin (born 1988), Kazakhstani-Bulgarian cross-country skier
Dmitry Gridin (born 1968), Russian serial killer
Gennady Gridin (born 1961), Russian association football coach and a former player
Sergey Gridin (born 1987), Kazakhstani football player

Russian-language surnames